Jeanette Nolan (December 30, 1911 – June 5, 1998) was an American actress. Nominated for four Emmy Awards, she had roles in the television series The Virginian (1962–1971) and Dirty Sally (1974), and in films such as Macbeth (1948).

Career

Nolan began her prolific acting career at the Pasadena Playhouse in Pasadena, California, and, while a student at Los Angeles City College, made her radio debut in 1932 in Omar Khayyam, the first transcontinental broadcast from station KHJ. She continued acting into the 1990s.

She appeared regularly in several radio series, including Young Doctor Malone, 1939–1940; Cavalcade of America, 1940–1941; Nicolette Moore in One Man's Family, 1947–1950; and The Great Gildersleeve, 1949–1952. She appeared episodically in many more

She made her film debut as Lady Macbeth in Orson Welles' 1948 film Macbeth, based on Shakespeare's play of the same name. Despite the fact that she and the film received withering reviews at the time, Nolan's film career flourished in largely supporting roles. Viewers of film noir may know her best as the corrupt wife of a dead (and equally corrupt) police officer in Fritz Lang's The Big Heat.

Nolan made more than three hundred television appearances, including the religion anthology series, Crossroads and as Dr. Marion in the 1956 episode "The Healer" in Brian Keith's CBS Cold War series, Crusader. She appeared on Rod Cameron's syndicated series, State Trooper.

In 1957 she played "Ma Grilk" in S3E5's "Potato Road" on the TV Western Series Gunsmoke. Nolan was cast as Emmy Zecker in the 1959 episode "Johnny Yuma" of the ABC western series, The Rebel, starring Nick Adams. She appeared in two episodes of David Janssen's crime drama, Richard Diamond, Private Detective.  She starred as Maggie Bowers in the Peter Gunn episode "Love Me to Death" in 1959.  She played Sadie Grimes in Alfred Hitchcock Presents episode titled "The Right Kind of House" which first aired March 9, 1958, and Mrs. Edith in "Coming Home" June 13, 1961.

From 1959 to 1960, she played Annette Deveraux, part-owner of the hotel in the CBS western series, Hotel de Paree, with Earl Holliman. In 1960, she appeared in season 4, episode 7 of Richard Boone's Have Gun – Will Travel as a newly widowed sheriff. Also, in 1962, season 5, episode 24, as the lost mother of an Eastern school girl. She appeared in two other episodes. She was cast in other western films, including The Wild Women of Chastity Gulch (1982).

Nolan made six guest appearances on CBS's Perry Mason, including the role of murderer Mrs. Kirby in the 1958 episode, "The Case of the Fugitive Nurse," murderer Emma Benson in the 1960 episode, "The Case of the Nine Dolls," Mama Norden in "The Case of the Hateful Hero," Martha Blair in the 1962 episode "The Case of the Counterfeit Crank," title character and murderer Nellie in the 1964 episode, "The Case of the Betrayed Bride," and defendant Emma Ritter in the 1965 episode, "The Case of the Fugitive Fraulein."

She guest starred as "Sister Mary Paul", a nun fooled into hiding an injured killer, in the 1961 S3Ep24 episode "The Good & The Bad" in CBS's Bat Masterson.

She then portrayed Janet Picard in the episode "Woman in the River" of the ABC/Warner Brothers detective series Bourbon Street Beat, starring Andrew Duggan. She gave an over-the-top performance as a crazed old woman in the "Parasite Mansion" episode of NBC's Thriller.

On April 27, 1962, she appeared in the episode "A Book of Faces" on another ABC crime drama, Target: The Corruptors!, starring Stephen McNally and Robert Harland. She guest starred as Claire Farnham in the episode "To Love Is to Live" on the psychiatric medical drama The Eleventh Hour. She was cast as a fortune teller, Mme. Di Angelo, in the 1963 episode "The Black-Robed Ghost" of the anthology series, GE True, hosted by Jack Webb.

She was a member of the repertory cast of The Richard Boone Show, appearing in 25 episodes.

In 1963, Nolan was cast as Mrs. Mertens in the episode "Reformation of Willie" on the ABC drama series, Going My Way, starring Gene Kelly as a Roman Catholic priest in New York City. Coincidentally, Going My Way followed the western series Wagon Train on the ABC schedule. Nolan herself appeared three times on Wagon Train, in which her husband, John McIntire, co-starred as wagon master Chris Hale from 1961 to 1965.

In 1963, Nolan also guest starred as Sister Therese in the episode "Infant of Prague" on ABC's World War II series, Combat!.

Nolan guest-starred three times from 1963 to 1964 on Dr. Kildare, and in a 1964 episode of Richard Crenna's short-lived Slattery's People, a political drama series on CBS. Earlier, she had appeared with Crenna and Walter Brennan in their sitcom, The Real McCoys.

Nolan played the role of witches in two of Rod Serling's anthology television series: The Twilight Zone, in the episode "Jess-Belle" with Anne Francis; and the Night Gallery segment "Since Aunt Ada Came to Stay" opposite James Farentino and Michele Lee.  Nolan also appeared in the 1962 Twilight Zone episode "The Hunt," with Arthur Hunnicutt. Nolan was cast in 1964 as a repertory cast member in the acclaimed but short-lived television anthology series "The Richard Boone Show" appearing in 13 episodes.

In 1964 she guest starred on Gunsmoke, playing the title character "Aunt Thede" (S10E13).

On November 4, 1965, Nolan portrayed the treacherous Ma Burns in "The Golden Trail" episode of NBC's Laredo. Ma Burns is a supposedly refined woman trying to hijack a presumed gold shipment headed to Laredo from St. Louis. In actuality, the cargo consists of thirty-six bottles of Tennessee whisky. She was also cast on Laredo as Martha Tuforth in "It's the End of the Road, Stanley" (1966) and as Vita Rose in "Like One of the Family" (1967). Laredo was a two-season spinoff of The Virginian, whose cast Nolan joined in 1967 as Holly Grainger, along with her husband John McIntire who headed the cast as ranch owner Clay Grainger.

In 1968, Nolan was cast in the episode "All in a Day's Work" on the NBC police drama Ironside, playing a mother who has lost her only child who was shot after a robbery.  That same year, she appeared on Hawaii Five-O in the role of Aunt Martha.

Nolan guest-starred on the short-lived sitcom The Mothers-in-Law in two separate episodes in the second and final season of the series. She first played Kaye Ballard's grandmother, Gabriela Balotta, who always fainted when she didn't get her way; and then secondly as Annie MacTaggart, a Scottish nanny hired to take care of newborn twins of the younger couple, Jerry and Suzie Buell.

In 1974, she starred briefly with Dack Rambo in CBS's Dirty Sally, a spinoff of Gunsmoke, on which she had played a recurring guest role for three episodes. She also played the titular role in the award-winning short film Peege (1972) because of her Gunsmoke connection.
Nolan appeared as a guest star in television's Gunsmoke more than any other female.

Nolan portrayed Mrs. Peck in the 1973 episode "Double Shock" of Peter Falk's Columbo series. She was also in a second Columbo episode, as Kate O'Connell in "The Conspirators" (1978). In 1985, she played Alma Lindstrom, Rose Nylund's adoptive mother, in the ninth episode of the first season of the hit NBC sitcom The Golden Girls.

Her final film appearance was in Robert Redford's The Horse Whisperer of 1998 as Tom Booker's mother, Ellen.

Personal life and death
Nolan graduated from Abraham Lincoln High School in her native Los Angeles, California.

In 1935, Nolan married actor John McIntire; the couple remained together until his death in 1991. Nolan and McIntire had two children together: Holly, a photographer, and Tim, an actor.

Nolan and McIntire worked together several times from the late 1960s on, sometimes as voice actors. They appeared in a 1969 KCET television reading of Norman Corwin's 1938 radio play The Plot to Overthrow Christmas, with McIntire as the Devil and Nolan as Lucrezia Borgia.

In 1977, they appeared in Disney's twenty-third animated film The Rescuers, in which McIntire voiced the cat Rufus and Nolan the muskrat Ellie Mae. Four years later, the couple worked on the 24th Disney film, The Fox and the Hound, with McIntire as the voice of Mr. Digger, an ill-tempered badger, and Nolan as the voice of Widow Tweed, the old kindly widow who takes in Tod after his mother was killed by an off-screen hunter.

They guest-starred on screen together, often portraying a married couple, as in an episode of The Love Boat in 1978, Charlie's Angels in 1979, The Incredible Hulk in 1980, Goliath Awaits in 1981, Quincy, M.E. in 1983, and Night Court in 1985, playing Dan Fielding's hick Louisianan parents.

Nolan died  of a stroke in Cedars-Sinai Medical Center on June 5, 1998. She was buried in Eureka, Montana's Tobacco Valley Cemetery.

Selected filmography
Macbeth (1948) – Lady Macbeth
Words and Music (1948) – Mrs. Hart
Abandoned (1949) – Major Ellen Ross
No Sad Songs for Me (1950) – Mona Frene
Saddle Tramp (1950) – Ma Higgins
Kim (1950) – Foster Mother (uncredited)
The Secret of Convict Lake (1951) – Harriet Purcell
The Happy Time (1952) – Felice Bonnard
Hangman's Knot (1952) – Mrs. Margaret Harris
The Big Heat (1953) – Bertha Duncan
A Lawless Street (1955) – Mrs. Dingo Brion
Tribute to a Bad Man (1956) – Mrs. L.A. Peterson
Everything but the Truth (1956) – Miss Adelaide Dabney
7th Cavalry (1956) – Charlotte Reynolds
The Halliday Brand (1957) – Nante
The Guns of Fort Petticoat (1957) – Cora Melavan
April Love (1957) – Henrietta Bruce
Mr. Adams and Eve (TV series, 1958) – Grand Duchess Maria (Episode: "Command Performance")
The Deep Six (1958) – Mrs. Austen
Wild Heritage (1958) – Ma (Janet) Bascomb
Alfred Hitchcock (1958) Episode "The Right Kind of House"
The Rabbit Trap (1959) – Mrs. Colt
The Restless Gun (1959) Episode "The Sweet Sisters"
Psycho (1960) – Norma Bates (voice, uncredited)
The Great Impostor (1961) – Ma Demara
Two Rode Together (1961) – Mrs. Mary McCandles
Wagon Train (1962) "The Janet Hale Story"-Janet Hale
The Man Who Shot Liberty Valance (1962) – Nora Ericson
Have Gun-Will Travel (1962) – Various (4 episodes)
The Twilight Zone (1962) – Rachel Simpson (Episode: "The Hunt")
Twilight of Honor (1963) – Amy Clinton
The Richard Boone Show (1964) – Repertory Cast Member (25 episodes)
Gunsmoke (1964) – Aunt Thede
My Three Sons (1964)Aunt Kate
My Blood Runs Cold (1965) – Aunt Sarah
Wagon Train Episode: The Chottsie Gubenheimer Story (1965)Chottsie Gubenheimer
Chamber of Horrors (1966) – Mrs. Ewing Perryman
The Reluctant Astronaut (1967) – Mrs. Fleming
Did You Hear the One About the Traveling Saleslady? (1968) – Ma Webb
The Virginian (TV series) (1971) – Holly Grainger (27 episodes)
Gunsmoke (1972) – Various (8 episodes)
Peege (1973) – Peege
The Sky's the Limit (1975) – Gertie
The Winds of Autumn (1976) – Ora Mae Hankins
The Rescuers (1977) – Ellie Mae (voice)
The Manitou (1978) – Mrs. Winconis
Avalanche (1978) – Florence Shelby
Columbo (1978) - Kate O’Connell
The Incredible Hulk (1980) – Lucy Cash (Episode: "A Rock and a Hard Place")
The Fox and the Hound (1981) – Widow Tweed (voice)
True Confessions (1981) – Mrs. Spellacy
Goliath Awaits (1981) – Mrs. Bartholomew
Cloak and Dagger (1984) – Eunice MacCready
The Golden Girls (1985) – Alma Nylund
Street Justice (1987) – Mrs. Chandler
The Horse Whisperer (1998) – Grandma Ellen Booker (final film role)

References

External links

 
 

1911 births
1998 deaths
American radio actresses
American film actresses
American stage actresses
American television actresses
Los Angeles City College alumni
Actresses from Los Angeles
American Shakespearean actresses
20th-century American actresses
Burials in Montana